Geoffrey Robert Gardner (born 1961) is a political figure from the Australian territory of Norfolk Island.

Chief Minister of Norfolk Island
Gardner was the chief minister of Norfolk Island from 5 December 2001 to 2 June 2006. He was succeeded in that post by David Buffett.

Speaker of the Legislative Assembly
Gardner was appointed Speaker of the Norfolk Legislative Assembly in 2006, serving until 2007.

Athletics
Gardner is the vice-president of the World Athletics, formerly the International Association of Athletics Federations and up until September 2019 was the president of Oceania Athletics since 2007.

See also
 Politics of Norfolk Island

Link
 https://web.archive.org/web/20080719102547/http://www.norfolk.gov.nf/geoff_gardner.htm

1960 births
Heads of government of Norfolk Island
Living people